The Regiment Special Force (RSF) is a Sri Lanka Air Forces elite special force unit, which is part of the SLAF Regiment. It was raised in 2006.The RSF Wing is an independent formation of the SLAF and commanded by a Commanding Officer who is responsible to the Commander of the Air Force through Director Ground Operations for the efficient and effective function.

History
The squadron was formed due to the Bandaranaike Airport attack by the LTTE.. Initially formed as Air Base Defence and Rescue Squadron on 7 July 2003 it was later renamed as Regiment Special Forces Wing in 2006.

Role 
 CA/CP/Reinforcement Operations.
 Battlefield Rescue/ Recovery Operations with respect to downed aircraft/aircrew and passengers.
 Sea/Air/Land  disaster related search and rescue missions related to natural and man made disasters.
 Securing landing zones/pickup zones for insertion extraction of special operations forces of Army/Navy/Air Force.
 Recapturing air bases.
Provide defenses in an enemy attack as a rapid deployment force.
Rescue operations and recovering of downed air crew in enemy or friendly terrain.
Assist civil authorities in national emergency.

Capabilities   
CQB or Close Combat Fighting
Most Air Bases are heavily built up due to availability of aircraft hangars and other related infrastructure. RSF skills on house clearance and close quarter fighting provides an added advantage for operating effectively with minimum collateral damage in Air Bases.

Special Reconnaissance
SR by the RSF can be highly effective when conventional or tactical collection assets are unable to collect information of operational significance.

Explosive Ordnance Disposal

Airborne Forces

Combat Search and Rescue

Security Warfare And Advanced Tactics Course

Training 
The unit's personnel are trained in air base rescue operations, field craft, bomb disposal, fire fighting, water survival and rescue operations. Advanced training is carried out at the Sri Lanka Army Special Force training school at Maduruoya.

 RSF basic course
 Heli-born Course
 Water-born Course
 Tactical Urban Fighting Unit (TUF)
 Special operations phase for advance Regt Cadets.
 Jungle Survival Course for air crews
 Orientation courses for Air gunners
 Refresher courses for RSF
 QRT Course
 Leadership Training for out siders
 Team building Corse for School cadets

Equipment

Handguns

  Glock 17
    M9

Assault Rifles

    M16
      QBZ-95
  SAR-21
      Type 56-2
      Type 56 (Ceremonial purposes only)

Sub-machine Guns

   Uzi
  MP5 (MP5A3, MP5SD6, MP5KA5)	

Machine Guns

    Type 80 machine gun
  FN MAG

Snipers

  L96A1
  PSG1
  M93

Grenade Launchers

  M203
   MGL

Rocket Launchers

  Type 69 RPG

Anti-Aircraft Weapons Systems

  SA-18
  L40/70
  ZSU-23-2
  TCM-20

Vehicles

  Unibuffel
    Defender
  Unicorn

 Mortars

  W84
  Type 89

See also 
Military of Sri Lanka
Sri Lanka Air Force
Military ranks and insignia of the Sri Lanka Air Force
Sri Lanka Army Commando Regiment
Sri Lanka Army Special Forces Regiment
Special Boat Squadron

External links
Ministry of Defence Sri Lanka
Sri Lanka Air Force
Passing Out Parade of Regiment Special Force, Air Force News

Sri Lanka Air Force
Special forces of Sri Lanka
Military units and formations established in 2003